Cerro de Plata is a corregimiento in Cañazas District, Veraguas Province, Panama with a population of 1,594 as of 2010. Its population as of 1990 was 3,563; its population as of 2000 was 1,595.

References

Corregimientos of Veraguas Province